Senator Barnard may refer to:

George Henry Barnard (1868–1954), Senate of Canada from 1945 to 1954
Isaac D. Barnard (1791–1834), U.S. Senator for Pennsylvania from 1827 to 1831
Paul Barnard (politician), Wyoming State Senate